Badminton events for the 1971 Southeast Asian Peninsular Games were held at Kuala Lumpur, Malaysia between 11 to 18 December 1971. San Myint (Burma, Men's singles), Chirasak Champakao & Pornchai Sakuntaniyom (Thailand, Men's doubles), Yap Hei Lin (Malaysia, Women's singles), Sumol Chanklum & Petchroong Liengtrakulngam (Thailand, Women's doubles), Smas Slayman & Thi Do My Lanh (Cambodia, Mixed doubles); all of these players finished at fourth place. At the end of the competitions, host Malaysia stood top in the tally by winning five gold medals while Thailand won gold medals in Women's doubles and Women's team events.

Medal winners

Final results

Bronze medal matches

Medal table

References

External links 
HISTORY OF THE SEA GAMES, olympic.org.my

1971
1971 in badminton
1971 in Malaysian sport
Badminton tournaments in Malaysia
Sports competitions in Kuala Lumpur